Kellin Quinn Bostwick is an American singer and musician. He is the lead vocalist and keyboardist of the post-hardcore band Sleeping with Sirens. Aside from his band, he is well-known for collaborating with other artists.

Career 

Quinn is the vocalist of the band Sleeping with Sirens with guitarist and songwriter Titus Lockard and also auditioned to become the vocalist for Dance Gavin Dance before joining Sleeping with Sirens in 2009.

The band released their first album in 2010, With Ears to See and Eyes to Hear through Rise Records, which sold 25,000 copies and reached number seven on the Billboard charts.

Sleeping with Sirens released a single in celebration of Halloween, "Dead Walker Texas Ranger" on October 22, 2012. Quinn participated in the music video for "King for a Day" by the band Pierce the Veil, released in 2012. The single went gold in 2014 and platinum in January 2020.

Quinn owns his own clothing line, "Anthem Made", and is the founder of "Dreamer Development Group", a support network for aspiring artists like Manic, and Roseburg.

Personal life 
Quinn married Katelynne Lahmann in 2013. The couple have a daughter, born in 2012. He also has two stepsons from Katelynne's previous marriage.

Discography

Studio albums 
Sleeping with Sirens

 With Ears to See and Eyes to Hear (2010)
 Let's Cheers to This (2011)
 Feel (2013)
 Madness (2015)
 Gossip (2017)
 How It Feels to Be Lost (2019)
 Complete Collapse (2022)

Special collaborations

References 

American male singer-songwriters
People from Medford, Oregon
Living people
Singer-songwriters from Oregon
Year of birth missing (living people)